The Men's marathon 1C was a wheelchair marathon event in athletics at the 1984 Summer Paralympics. The race was won by Alan Dufty.

Results

See also
 Marathon at the Paralympics

References 

Men's marathon 1C
1984 marathons
Marathons at the Paralympics
Men's marathons